Dayan (also Romanized as Dāyān) is a village in Keyvan Rural District, in the Central District of Khoda Afarin County, East Azerbaijan Province, Iran. According to 2006 census, its population was 46, in 10 families.

References 

Populated places in Khoda Afarin County